Dupleix was a steam and sail corvette of the  built for the French Marine Nationale. She was the first French vessel named after the 18th century governor of Pondichéry and Gouverneur Général of the French possessions in India Marquess Joseph François Dupleix.

After her commissioning, Dupleix was sent to the Chinese Sea under Vice-Admiral Jaures. She arrived in Saigon on 25 August 1862, and made short stops in Ryukyu Islands and the port of Hakodate on the island of Hokkaidō, before arriving in Yokohama.

Bombardment of Shimonoseki
During the bombardment of Shimonoseki (5 September 1864), Dupleix was second in the line of corvettes, between the British  and the Dutch Metallkruz. She fired 411 shots and received 22 cannonballs (seven in the hull, four under the waterline, and 11 in the sails). She had two killed and eight wounded. On 28 December 1864, Dupleix sailed back to France, where she was decommissioned on the 25 June 1865.

She was re-commissioned in Cherbourg in 1867, and sent back to serve in the "Far-East Naval Division", under Counter-Admiral Gustave Ohier. She arrived in Yokohama in February 1868, and was immediately involved in the events of the Japanese Revolution.

Sakai incident

On 8 March 1868, a skiff sent to Sakai was attacked by samurai retainers of the daimyō of Tosa; 11 sailors and Midshipman Guillou were killed (a monument in Kobe is now erected to their memory). The captain, Abel-Nicolas Bergasse du Petit-Thouars, protested so strongly that the culprits were arrested, and 20 of them were sentenced to death by seppuku. However, the execution style was so shocking to the French that after 11 were carried out, the French captain requested grace for the survivors. This allowed the French and Japanese parties to reconcile, and is now known as the "Sakai incident", or Sakai Jiken (堺事件).

On 16 April 1868, Dupleix was the first Western ship to salute the Emperor at Fort Tempozan. In October of the same year, Dupleix was sent to Hokkaido. She rescued the British corvette , which was shipwrecked at Romanzoff Bay, in La Pérouse Strait.

Hokkaidō
Relieved by the aviso Coëtlogon, Dupleix was stationed in the northern port of Hakodate during the Battle of Hakodate, in order to guarantee French interests there. She brought back Captain Jules Brunet and his companions from Hakodate to Yokohama after the fall of the Republic of Ezo.

From July 1870 to February 1871, Dupleix blockaded the German frigate  in Nagasaki as part of operations during the Franco-Prussian War. In March, Dupleix sailed back to Cherbourg to be decommissioned.

From 1876 to 1886, Dupleix was re-armed every year from March to October to monitor fishery operations in Iceland. She was struck in 1887.

Cosmao-class corvettes
Ships built in France
1861 ships
Boshin War